Oshnar (also Romanized as Oshnār) is a village in Barvanan-e Sharqi Rural District, Torkamanchay District, Meyaneh County, East Azerbaijan Province, Iran. At the time of the 2006 census, its population was 558, in 103 families.

References 

Populated places in Meyaneh County